Colias canadensis, the Canada sulphur, is a butterfly in the family Pieridae found in North America. It has only been found from Alaska and Northwest Territories, to northern British Columbia and Alberta.

Flight period is early May to early August. Its habitats include open taiga forests, wet tundra, mountain valleys, and alpine tundra near tree lines. 

Wingspan is from 32 to 47 mm.

References

canadensis
Butterflies of North America
Butterflies described in 1982